Ellen Annette Martin (January 16, 1847 – March 13, 1916) was an early and little-known American attorney who achieved an early victory in securing women's suffrage in Illinois. She was the first woman to vote in Illinois.

Ellen Martin graduated the University of Michigan, Ann Arbor law school in 1875 and was admitted to the Illinois bar in 1876.

On April 6, 1891, in Lombard, Illinois, Ellen Martin led a group of 14 prominent women to the voting place at the general store. Although suffrage was restricted to men in Illinois at that time, Lombard was governed by its pre-1870 compact which omitted any mention of gender.  Miss Martin therefore demanded that the three male election judges allow the women to vote. Reportedly, the voting judges were flabbergasted by Miss Martin: "Mr. Marquardt was taken with a spasm, Reber leaned stiff against the wall, and Vance fell backward into the flour barrel."

A county judge eventually proclaimed the legitimacy of the women's votes, which became the first women's votes tabulated in Illinois history. Thus, Ellen Martin was the first woman in Illinois to vote. However, the men of Lombard quickly reorganized the town charter in line with the state charter, so that women were only allowed to vote in school elections. By 1916, Illinois women could vote in national elections, and the 19th Amendment (the Women's Suffrage Amendment) was passed in 1920.

In 2008, the city of Lombard, Illinois, declared April 6 to be "Ellen Martin Day" in commemoration of Ms. Martin's historic victory for women's suffrage.

See also
List of first women lawyers and judges in Illinois

References

1847 births
1916 deaths
People from Chautauqua County, New York
American suffragists
People from Lombard, Illinois
University of Michigan Law School alumni
Activists from New York (state)
19th-century American women lawyers
19th-century American lawyers